Pascall is an Australian and New Zealand confectionery brand, which is owned by Mondelēz International.

History
Pascall products were first produced as a joint venture between the Cadbury Brothers and James Pascall at the Cadbury factory in Tasmania, Australia.

In 1938, Pascall products commenced production in New Zealand.

In 1981, Australian Pascall production moved from Tasmania to Melbourne. In New Zealand, most of the products produced by Pascall were made at their own factory in Avondale, Auckland until December 2009, when the factory was closed down and production moved to the Cadbury factory in Dunedin and to factories in Australia and Thailand. The response to the changes has not been popular with New Zealanders, claiming that the Thai made Minties are much softer and do not taste the same.

Current products 
 Barley Sugar
 Butter Scotch
 Caramels
Clinkers
 Eclairs
 Explorers (formerly "Eskimos")
 Fruit Bon Bons
 Fruit Burst
 Jellies
 Jubes
 Licorice Allsorts
 Marshmallows
 Memorables
 Minties (in New Zealand)
 Mints
 Milk Bottles 
 Party Pack
 Pineapple Lumps
 Snifters Lumps
 Wine Gums

 Fruit Allsorts
 Milkshakes
 Jaffa Lumps

Former products 
 Columbines
 Country Mints
 JayBees 
 Mr Beans
 Pebbles 
 Snifters
 Sparkles
 Swirls
 Tangy Fruits
 Blackberries & Raspberries
 Liquorice Chews, Spearmint Chews, Chocolate Chews

References

External links 
 Cadbury Australia - Pascall
 Pascall New Zealand

Food manufacturers of New Zealand
Mondelez International brands
New Zealand brands
Australian brands
Products introduced in 1938
New Zealand companies established in 1938
Manufacturing companies established in 1938